Competitor for  Canada

Florence Jane Bell (June 2, 1910 – July 1, 1998) was a Canadian track and field athlete who competed mainly in the 100 metres.

Career
From Toronto, Ontario, Bell competed for Canada in the 1928 Summer Olympics in Amsterdam, Netherlands in the 4 x 100 metres where she won the gold medal with her teammates Fanny Rosenfeld, Ethel Smith, and Myrtle Cook.

Outside of track, Bell was also a competitive swimmer, curler and golfer, and worked as a physical education teacher at the Margaret Eaton School of Physical Culture in Toronto.

Death
Bell died in Fort Myers, Florida, aged 88.

References

1910 births
1998 deaths
Canadian female sprinters
Athletes (track and field) at the 1928 Summer Olympics
Canadian people of Scottish descent
Olympic gold medalists for Canada
Olympic track and field athletes of Canada
People from Old Toronto
Medalists at the 1928 Summer Olympics
Canadian schoolteachers
Athletes from Toronto
Olympic gold medalists in athletics (track and field)
Olympic female sprinters